The 2020 Loudoun United FC season is Loudoun United FC's second season of existence, their second in the second-division of American soccer, and their 2nd in the USL Championship. The team only played one competitive match before the USL Championship suspended all league matches due to the COVID-19 pandemic until further notice. 

On July 11, the league resumed play in a radically different format: all USLC teams were sorted into regional Groups for a round-robin style tournament, where the top two teams from each Group would earn a playoff spot. Loudoun United was drawn into Group F with other teams from the Northeastern US, and would resume play on July 20 against Hartford Athletic.

On September 25, Loudoun United announced that some of their team members had tested positive for COVID-19, and that they would cancel the rest of the season. The team's poor performance resulted in only one win throughout the entire season and mathematical elimination from competing for the USL Championship Final.

Club

Roster

Competitions

Exhibitions

USL Championship

Original Standings

Group F Table
The standings for the Group include the results of any games that were played before the season was suspended.

U.S. Open Cup 

Due to their ownership by a higher division professional club (D.C. United), LUFC is one of 15 teams expressly forbidden from entering the Cup competition.

References 

Loudoun United FC seasons
Loudoun United FC
Loudoun United FC
Loudoun United